James Docherty was a Scottish footballer who played in the Football League for Derby County and Luton Town.

References

Date of birth unknown
Date of death unknown
Scottish footballers
English Football League players
Association football midfielders
Pollokshields Athletic F.C. players
Derby County F.C. players
Luton Town F.C. players
Cowes Sports F.C. players
Footballers from Glasgow